HSC  Dubravka is a catamaran type passenger ship owned by Croatian shipping company Jadrolinija with a capacity of 306 passengers.

Sisterships: Judita, Karolina, Novalja.

References

Passenger ships
Passenger ships of Croatia